Dyna Lighthouse is a coastal lighthouse located on a reef south of Bygdøy, in the Oslofjord in the municipality of Oslo, Norway. It was established in 1875, and automated in 1956.

See also

 List of lighthouses in Norway
 Lighthouses in Norway

References

External links
 
 Norsk Fyrhistorisk Forening 

Lighthouses completed in 1875
Lighthouses in Oslo